Pokémon Unite (stylized as Pokémon UNITE) is a free-to-play, multiplayer online battle arena video game developed by TiMi Studio Group and published by The Pokémon Company for Android and iOS and by Nintendo for the Nintendo Switch. It was announced in a Pokémon Presents presentation on 24 June 2020. The game was released for the Nintendo Switch on 21 July 2021, and was released for Android and iOS in 73 countries on 22 September 2021. As of August 2022, the game has been downloaded over 80 million times across all platforms.

Gameplay
Pokémon Unite is a multiplayer online battle arena game, with standard matches consisting of two teams, each with 5 players. Each match is limited to 10 minutes in duration, and the team with the highest total score by the end of each match wins. A team can also win if the opposing team surrenders. Surrendering can only happen if the match reaches the halfway mark, and if a majority vote among the team members is reached. If there is a tie, the team that scored the tied score first wins. There are limited time maps, and a game mode called Quick Battle, which is five minutes long with four players (sometimes 3) on each team. The Quick Battle game mode has different maps, each with some changes to the rules, size of map and species of wild Pokémon temporary event maps. 

Each player starts a match controlling a relatively weak Pokémon. The Pokémon may become stronger and gain access to new "moves" by capturing wild Pokémon, helping defeat wild Pokémon that their teammate captures, and knocking out enemy player Pokémon. The "type" system common in other Pokémon games, a system similar to rock paper scissors that determines each Pokémon's effectiveness against others, is absent from Pokémon Unite. However, the game includes a new mechanic to the series known as "Unite Moves", which are moves similar to Ultimate moves in other MOBAs, and are unique to each Pokémon and are unlocked at certain levels depending on the Pokémon. , over 20 playable Pokémon were officially revealed or found in the beta testing versions of the game. As of February 2023, 50 Pokémon are playable in the game.

Aside from the gameplay, Pokémon Unite is unique from other MOBAs due to the fact that there is no in-game scoreboard, to prevent players from leaving the game out of frustration when they are losing in score.

Development
TiMi, a Chinese video game developer, began a closed beta test in January 2021. This test was limited to select players in China.

In February 2021, The Pokémon Company announced that another closed beta test would be scheduled for March 2021, this time specifically for Canadian Android smartphone users.

The reveal of Pokémon Unite was controversial, with outlets discussing the game's potential to open a new competitive gaming scene to a fresh audience. The YouTube video of the announcement quickly became the most disliked video on The Pokémon Company's YouTube channel.

The Nintendo Switch version of the game was officially released on 21 July 2021. The mobile versions for iOS and Android have been released as of 22 September 2021. TiMi plans to continue development of the game after its official release, such as offering new playable Pokémon as downloadable content, the first of which became available for players on 28 July 2021.

In esports
In January 2022, it was officially confirmed by producer Masaaki Hoshino that the game would be part of the Pokémon World Championships taking place in August, joining the main series games (known as VGC), the TCG, Pokémon Go, and Pokkén Tournament's last Championship Series season. In a statement on the game's official website, he also stated that a tournament mode is in development, wherein the playing field would be evened for all competitors, regardless of the grade of their items. The tournament mode was eventually released on 20 January 2022. In the same month, the game was used as part of the AKB48 Group Invitational tournament, which in turn formed part of the Pokémon Battle Festival Asia online event, hosted by ESL Asia. MNL48's Team Padayon won the event after they defeated BNK48's Yummy Remote 3-1 in the Grand Finals.

For the first season of the Pokémon Unite Championship Series, there were 11 supported Regional Zones: North America, Mexico, Central America, South America-West, South America-East, Japan, South Korea, Europe, Oceania, India, and the Asia-Pacific regions. Players must be 16 or 18 to register, depending on their Regional Zone.

In each month, in the lead up to the World Championships, a series of tournaments in each Regional Zone will be held. Like other games held in the World Championships, teams will be awarded championship points (CP), and the CP can be kept by players to allow team changes as the season progresses. 

The top 8 teams in CP from each Regional Zone before June qualify for a spot in the Regional Championships. The Regional Championships begin with a round-robin tournament, with teams split into four groups, before switching to a double-elimination tournament for the finals. The top performing teams in the finals qualify for the World Championships.

American team BLVKHVND won the first Unite Championship Series title in August 2022 in London.

Reception

Pokémon Unite received "mixed or average" reviews, according to review aggregator Metacritic. IGN gave the game a 6/10, criticizing some microtransactions as enabling pay-to-win gameplay. The game's microtransactions have also been criticized for their price, specifically, one of the customizable options for one of the Pokémon, Alolan Ninetales, costing US$40. This would also happen again with a Halloween-exclusive skin for the Pokémon Lucario, as well as a Christmas-themed skin for Pikachu. In response to discussions about the game on social media amongst fans, The Pokémon Company—through the official Pokémon Unite Twitter account—promoted a survey for feedback from fans to improve the game.

By 16 September 2021, the game had been downloaded over 9 million times on the Switch, with over 7.5 million mobile pre-registrations prior to the 22 September mobile release. By 1 October, research company Sensor Tower reported that Unite has been downloaded 30 million times for mobile devices, while The Pokémon Company confirmed that the game has been downloaded over 25 million times on all platforms by 4 October. On 6 December 2021, The Pokémon Company announced that the downloads figure had reached 50 million. It was further confirmed that the game passed the 70 million downloads mark in April 2022, and 80 million by August 2022.

Awards
Pokémon Unite won the award for Best Game of Google Play's Best of 2021, as well as being nominated for Best Mobile Game for the 2021 Game Awards. It also won "Mobile Game of the Year" at the 25th Annual D.I.C.E. Awards.

References

External links

Promotional website

Free-to-play video games
2021 video games
Android (operating system) games
IOS games
Nintendo Switch games
Multiplayer online battle arena games
Real-time strategy video games
Unite
Video games developed in China
Video games set on fictional islands
Tencent
Video games with cross-platform play
Interactive Achievement Award winners